Joseph Gosling was an architect in San Francisco. He is credited with designing the Nevada State Capitol. He also designed the Frank G. Edwards House in San Francisco. It is listed on the National Register of Historic Places. He had an office at 9 Post Street in San Francisco. He also designed Turk Street School.

Before moving to San Francisco he worked as a carpenter in Virginia City, Nevada.

His plan for Nevada's capitol was a two-story building in the shape of a Grecian cross.

He submitted architectural plans for the Napa State Insane Asylum (Napa State Hospital) in 1870. He and Eusebius Joseph Molera (November 14, 1846 - January 14, 1932) were elected to become members of the San Francisco chapter of the American Institute of Architects in 1882.

Work

Nevada State Capitol (1871)
Turk Street School
Frank G. Edwards House (1883)

References

19th-century American architects
Architects from San Francisco
People from Virginia City, Nevada
American carpenters